Hunting is a surname. Notable people with the surname include:

John Hunting (referee) (born 1935), English football referee
John R. Hunting, American philanthropist
Tom Hunting (born 1965), American drummer

Fictional characters
Will Hunting, a character in the film Good Will Hunting